The Hulett was a design of automatic ore unloader.

Hulett may also refer to:

Hulett (surname)
Hulett, Wyoming, a town in Crook County, Wyoming, United States

People with the given name
Hulett C. Merritt (1872–1956), American businessman
Hulett C. Smith (1918–2012), American politician